Vanguard TV-3BU, also called Vanguard Test Vehicle-Three Backup, was the second flight of the American Vanguard rocket. An unsuccessful attempt to place an unnamed satellite, Vanguard 1B, into orbit, the rocket was launched on 5 February 1958. It was launched from LC-18A at the Cape Canaveral Air Force Station. Fifty-seven seconds after launch, control of the vehicle was lost and it failed to achieve orbit. At 57 seconds, the booster suddenly pitched down. The skinny second stage broke in half from aerodynamic stress, causing the Vanguard to tumble end-over-end before a range safety officer sent the destruct command. The cause of the failure was attributed to a spurious guidance signal that caused the first stage to perform unintended pitch maneuvers.

History 
Early Vanguard project tests had no failures. Vanguard TV-0, Vanguard Test Vehicle zero was a successful one-stage test done on 8 December 1956. Vanguard TV-1 was a successful one-stage test done on 1 May 1957. Vanguard TV-2 was a successful stage one test on 23 October 1957. Vanguard TV-3BU failure followed Vanguard TV-3 failure, putting the project in chaos. But the next launch, Vanguard 1 on Vanguard TV-4 was successful and put into orbit the fourth artificial Earth orbital satellite and the first satellite to be solar powered.

The failure was a setback in the space race, which let the Soviet Union gain. Thus Vanguard was not the first rocket to orbit an unmanned satellite. The first small-lift launch vehicle was the Sputnik rocket, an uncrewed orbital launch vehicle designed by Sergei Korolev in the Soviet Union, derived from the R-7 Semyorka Intercontinental ballistic missile (ICBM). On 4 October 1957, the Sputnik rocket was used to perform the world's first satellite launch, placing Sputnik 1 satellite into a low Earth orbit.

Mission 
The main purpose of the Vanguard Test Vehicle launchings was systems testing for the launch vehicle and satellite. The program objectives for the satellite were to conduct micrometeorite impact and geodetic measurements from Earth orbit. Engineering studies included electron charge and temperature of the satellite. The IGY Vanguard satellite program was designed with the purpose of launching one or more Earth-orbiting satellites during the International Geophysical Year (IGY), which ended on 31 December 1958.

Launch 
The launch took place on 5 February 1958 at 07:33 GMT from the Atlantic Missile Range, from LC-18A in Cape Canaveral Air Force Station, Florida. The initial launch was nominal, but at an altitude of ) a malfunction in a connection between units of the control system or in the first stage servo amplifier resulted in the loss of attitude control. Spurious electrical signals caused-motion of the first stage engine in the pitch plane. At an altitude of about 6.1 km (20,000 feet), 57 seconds into the flight, a violent pitch-down to 45° resulted in excessive structural and air loads on the launch vehicle, which broke up at the aft end of the second stage at 62 seconds, ending the mission.

Spacecraft 
Vanguard was the designation used for both the satellite and the launch vehicle. The satellite was identical to the Vanguard TV-3 satellite, an approximately 1.5 kg aluminum sphere of 16.3 cm in diameter, nearly identical to the later Vanguard 1. A cylinder lined with heat shields mounted inside the sphere held the instrument payload. It contained a set of mercury-batteries, a 10 mW, 108 MHz telemetry transmitter powered by the batteries, and a 5 mW, 108.03 MHz Minitrack beacon transmitter, which was powered by six square (roughly 5 cm on a side) solar cells, manufactured by Bell Laboratories, mounted on the body of the satellite. Six 30 cm long, 0.8 cm diameter spring-actuated aluminum alloy aerials protruded from the sphere. On actuation, the aerial axes were mutually perpendicular to lines that passed through the center of the sphere. The transmitters were primarily for engineering and tracking data, but were also to determine the total electron content between the spacecraft and ground stations. Vanguard also carried two thermistors which could measure the interior temperature in order to track the effectiveness of the thermal protection.

A cylindrical separation device was designed to keep the sphere attached to the third stage prior to deployment. At deployment, a strap holding the satellite in place would be released and three leaf springs would separate the satellite from the cylinder and third stage at a relative velocity of about 0.3 m/s.

Launch vehicle 
It also held  of hydrogen peroxide.

This stage contained the complete guidance and control system.

The thin  steel casing for the third stage had a hemispherical forward dome with a shaft at the center to support the spacecraft and an aft dome fairing into a steel exit nozzle.

This was the same launch vehicle configuration, with minor modifications, as used for Vanguard TV-3 and all succeeding Vanguard flights up to and including Vanguard SLV-6.

See also 

 Vanguard rocket
 Project Vanguard
 Comparison of orbital launch systems
 Comparison of orbital rocket engines
 Rocket
 Spacecraft propulsion

Further reading 
 Mallove, Eugene F. and Matloff, Gregory L. The Starflight Handbook: A Pioneer's Guide to Interstellar Travel, Wiley,

References 

1958 in spaceflight
Project Vanguard
Satellite launch failures
Spacecraft launched in 1958
Articles containing video clips
Space accidents and incidents in the United States